The Elusive Pimpernel may refer to: 

 The Elusive Pimpernel (novel), a 1908 novel by Baroness Orczy
 The Elusive Pimpernel (1919 film), an adaptation of the novel
 The Elusive Pimpernel (1950 film), an adaptation of the Baroness Orczy novel The Scarlet Pimpernel